Francois Rinaldi (1924-2002) was a French rugby league footballer who represented France national rugby league team.

Playing career
Rinaldi played for France, including touring Australia and New Zealand in 1951 and playing in the 1954 Rugby League World Cup.

Honours

Club
World Cup
 Runner-up in 1954 (France)
Rugby League European Nations Cup
 1 time champion in 1951 and 1952 (France)
French Championship
 1 time champion in 1949 (Marseille)
3 times runner-up in 1950, 1952 and 1954 (Marseille)
Lord Derby Cup
1 time runner-up in 1957 (Marseille)
1 time runner-up in 1955 (Marseille)

References

1924 births
2002 deaths
France national rugby league team players
French rugby league players
Marseille XIII players
Rugby league props
Sportspeople from Haute-Corse